The coppercheek darter (Nothonotus aquali) is a species of freshwater ray-finned fish, a darter from the subfamily Etheostomatinae, part of the family Percidae, which also contains the perches, ruffes and pikeperches. It is endemic to the southeastern United States. It is only known from the Duck River system of Tennessee. It is an inhabitant of small and medium rivers where it occurs in rocky riffles with clear, fast-flowing water. It preys on insect larvae and other immature stages and is also known to consume snails.

References

Nothonotus
Endemic fauna of Tennessee
Freshwater fish of the United States
Fish of the Eastern United States
Fish described in 1978
Taxonomy articles created by Polbot
Taxobox binomials not recognized by IUCN